Events from the year 1653 in England.

Incumbents
 Lord Protector – Oliver Cromwell (starting 16 December)
 Parliament – First Commonwealth Rump (until 20 April), Barebone's (starting 4 July, until 12 December)

Events
 18–20 February (28 February–2 March New Style) – First Anglo–Dutch War: Battle of Portland off the Isle of Portland.
 14 March – First Anglo–Dutch War: Battle of Leghorn: A Dutch fleet defeats the English; the Dutch commander, Johan van Galen, later dies of his wounds.
 18 April – London–York stagecoach first recorded.
 20 April – Oliver Cromwell dissolves the Rump Parliament.
 2–3 June (12–13 June New Style) – First Anglo-Dutch War: Battle of the Gabbard off the coast of Suffolk: The English navy defeats the Dutch fleet, which loses 17 ships.
 4 July–12 December – the Barebones Parliament meets in London.
 8 July – John Thurloe becomes Cromwell's head of intelligence.
 8–10 August – Battle of Scheveningen: the final naval battle of the First Anglo-Dutch War is fought, between the fleets of the Commonwealth and the United Provinces off the Texel; the English navy gains a tactical victory over the Dutch fleet.
 16 December – Instrument of Government: Britain's first written constitution, under which Oliver Cromwell becomes Lord Protector of England, Scotland, and Ireland, being advised by a remodelled Council of State. This is the start of The First Protectorate, bringing an end to the first period of republican government in the country, the Commonwealth of England.

Undated
 Cornelius Vermuyden completes excavation of the Forty Foot Drain and associated works for reclamation of The Fens.
 Sir Robert Shirley has a new parish church built at Staunton Harold in Leicestershire.

Publications
 Izaak Walton's discourse The Compleat Angler.

Births
 10 March – John Benbow, admiral (died 1702 in Jamaica)
 2 April – Prince George of Denmark, consort of Anne, Queen of Great Britain (died 1708)
 5 July – Thomas Pitt, Governor of Madras (died 1726)
 9 August – John Oldham, poet (died 1683)
 14 August – Christopher Monck, 2nd Duke of Albemarle, statesman (died 1688)
 3 September – Roger North, lawyer and biographer (died 1734)

Deaths
 21 January – John Digby, 1st Earl of Bristol, diplomat (born 1580)
 25 March – Nicholas Martyn, politician (born 1593)
 26 May – Robert Filmer, political theorist (born 1588)
 22 October – Thomas de Critz, painter (born 1607)
 December – John Taylor, "The Water Poet" (born 1578)

References

 
Years of the 17th century in England